Friendship "Turtle" Park is located at the junction of 45th and Van Ness Streets in the American University Park neighborhood of Washington, D.C. It is part of District of Columbia Department of Parks and Recreation. Renovation in 2015 was delayed because a sewer was discovered running under the recreation center.

External links
 
 Renovation delayed , 2015 May news item.

American University Park
Parks in Washington, D.C.